Stasanor (lived 4th century BC) was a native of Soli in Cyprus, who held a distinguished position among the officers of Alexander the Great.

Stasanor, officer of Alexander
Stasanor probably entered the service of Alexander after the siege of Tyre in 332 BC, but the first occasion on which his name is mentioned is during the campaign in Bactria, when he was detached by Alexander with a strong force to reduce Arsames, the revolted satrap of Aria. This service, in conjunction with Phrataphernes, he successfully accomplished, and rejoined Alexander at Zariaspa in the autumn of 328, bringing with him Arsames himself as a captive, as well as Barzanes, who had been appointed by Bessus satrap of Parthia.

Stasanor the Satrap

As a reward for this exploit Stasanor obtained the satrapy of Aria, which was, however, soon after changed for that of Drangiana, in the command of which he remained during the whole of Alexander's campaign in India. On the king's return, Stasanor was one of those who met him in Carmania with a very opportune supply of camels and other beasts of burden, but returned to resume the charge of his province when Alexander continued his march towards Persis. In the first partition of the provinces after the death of Alexander in 323, Stasanor retained his former satrapy of Drangiana, but in the subsequent division at Triparadisus in 321, he exchanged it for the more important government of Bactria and Sogdiana. 

Here Stasanor appears to have remained quiet for some years, taking no open part, so far as we are informed in the contest between Eumenes and Antigonus. After the victory of Antigonus, although Stasanor had apparently inclined in favour of Eumenes, Antigonus found it prudent to pardon him and in 316 BC, left him in the undisturbed possession of his satrapy  since Stasanor had secured the attachment of the native population by the justice and moderation of his rule, and thus firmly established his power in the satrapy.

Fate
From this time Stasanor's name does not appear again in history. Justin however explains that around 305 Seleucus attacked and conquered Bactria, probably in a conflict with Stasanor or possibly his successor:

Seleucos made many wars in the Orient after the division of the Macedonian kingdom between allies. At the beginning, he took Babylon; from there, his strengths increased by victory, he took over the Bactrians. He then went to India, which, after the death of Alexander, had assassinated his prefects, as if shaking the burden of servitude. Justin XV.4

See also
Stasander, another Cypriot general of Alexander the Great from Soli

References
Smith, William (editor); Dictionary of Greek and Roman Biography and Mythology, "Stasanor", Boston, (1867)

Notes

Ancient Greek generals
Generals of Alexander the Great
Ancient Cypriots
Satraps of the Alexandrian Empire
4th-century BC Greek people
Year of birth unknown
Year of death unknown